Kirsten Louise Hellier  (née Smith; born 6 October 1969 in Tokoroa) is a former javelin thrower, who represented New Zealand at the Commonwealth and the Olympic Games. She set her personal best (62.52 metres) in 1994 with the old javelin type. Hellier was the coach of World Champion shot putter Valerie Adams from 1998 until 2010.

At the 1994 Commonwealth Games Hellier won the silver medal in the women's javelin with a throw of 60.40 m. She placed 8th at the 1990 Commonwealth Games in the same event. Hellier competed at the 1992 Summer Olympics where she placed 17th overall in qualifying with a throw of 59.34 m.

Hellier currently works at Macleans College as a sports co-coordinator.

Her father Lionel Smith was a hurdler at the 1950 British Empire Games.

Hellier won the Halberg Awards Coach of the Year in 2007 and 2008. 

In the 2018 Queen's Birthday Honours, Hellier was appointed an Officer of the New Zealand Order of Merit, for services to sport, particularly athletics.

In 2020, Hellier was appointed to Athletics New Zealand in a key coaching role as Athletic NZ Programme Coach.  An interview with Hellier was featured in the 2022 documentary film Dame Valerie Adams: More than Gold.

Achievements

References

External links
 
 

1969 births
Living people
New Zealand female javelin throwers
Athletes (track and field) at the 1990 Commonwealth Games
Athletes (track and field) at the 1994 Commonwealth Games
Athletes (track and field) at the 1992 Summer Olympics
Commonwealth Games silver medallists for New Zealand
Olympic athletes of New Zealand
Sportspeople from Tokoroa
People educated at Macleans College
Commonwealth Games medallists in athletics
Officers of the New Zealand Order of Merit
Medallists at the 1994 Commonwealth Games